The men's tournament of the 2011 World Senior Curling Championships was held from April 15 to 24, 2011.

21 teams participated in three groups. The teams played a round robin within their groups, and the top two teams from each group automatically qualified for the quarterfinals. The third-ranked teams among the groups used a draw stone challenge to determine which group took the seventh spot in the quarterfinals. The remaining two third-ranked teams then played a qualification game to determine the last qualifying spot.

Teams

Blue Group

Red Group

Green Group

Round-robin standings
Final round-robin standings

Round-robin results
All draw times are listed in Central Standard Time (UTC-06).

Blue Group

Sunday, April 17
Draw 1
08:00

Draw 3
18:00

Monday, April 18
Draw 6
14:30

Tuesday, April 19
Draw 8
08:00

Draw 10
18:00

Wednesday, April 20
Draw 13
14:30

Draw 15
21:30

Thursday, April 21
Draw 17
14:30

Red Group

Sunday, April 17
Draw 2
11:30

Draw 4
21:30

Monday, April 18
Draw 5
11:00

Tuesday, April 19
Draw 8
08:00

Draw 10
18:00

Wednesday, April 20
Draw 13
14:30

Thursday, April 21
Draw 17
14:30

Draw 19
21:30

Green Group

Sunday, April 17
Draw 2
11:30

Draw 4
21:30

Monday, April 18
Draw 6
14:30

Tuesday, April 19
Draw 8
08:00

Draw 9
11:30

Draw 10
18:00

Draw 11
21:30

Wednesday, April 20
Draw 12
11:00

Draw 13
14:30

Draw 15
21:30

Thursday, April 21
Draw 19
21:30

Playoffs

Qualification Game
Friday, April 22, 15:00

Quarterfinals
Friday, April 22, 20:00

Semifinals
Saturday, April 23, 9:00

Bronze medal game
Saturday, April 23, 14:00

Gold medal game
Saturday, April 23, 14:00

References

External links

World Senior Curling Championships
World Senior Curling Championships, 2011
World Senior Curling Championships - Men's tournament
International curling competitions hosted by the United States
2011 in American sports
Curling in Minnesota